James H Boyd Intermediate School, formerly Cuba Hill School, is a three-year primary school serving grades 3–5. It is part of the Elwood School District in Huntington, New York.

History

Cuba Hill School was built in 1955 as a replacement to Elwood's aging Little Red Schoolhouse (formally called Elwood School), which opened in 1903 and still stands abandoned on Cuba Hill Road to this day. At that point the school comprised solely what is today the third and fourth grade wing. An annex to the school was constructed as a standalone building in the mid-1960s, and today serves as the fifth grade wing.

The school was renamed after the first superintendent of the Elwood Union Free School District James H. Boyd in 1982.

The two formerly separate buildings were connected in 2001 with the addition of a new auditorium.

In 2008, John Bisbal III, a fifth grader at Boyd, won $2,000 for winning the Wham-O 60th Anniversary National Kid's Inventor Contest. His toy was patented and was intended to be brought into the 2010 toy lineup, but has not been brought into fruition as of 2016.

References

External links
Elwood School District

Public elementary schools in New York (state)
Educational institutions established in 1955
Huntington, New York
Schools in Suffolk County, New York
1955 establishments in New York (state)